Christiaan Dirk Tonnis (born June 5, 1956, Saarbrücken, Germany) is a German symbolist/realist painter, draftsman, video artist and published author.

Work
Tonnis’ works are "supported with psychological knowledge" His earliest drawings reflect his interest in psychoanalysis and psychopathology such as, catatonic rigidity or the postnatal psychosis depicted in his 1980–85 collection. To "show the psychic as a second face" he "uses stitchings, masks and fragments of masks—they are sometimes barely visible"

In 1986, he started to paint landscapes from literature like the "Magic Mountain (after Thomas Mann)" and portraits of writers and philosophers as William S. Burroughs, Virginia Woolf, Ludwig Wittgenstein, and more. His large scale triptych "Frost" is "a material image in harsh black and white which depicts a literary landscape of snow and ice in different viewpoints [...] a picturesque transformation of Thomas Bernhards 1963 novel".

Since 2003 his work has become more meditative: "Geometric patterns in bright colors", consistent with Tibetan Book of the Dead (Bardo Thodol) and New Testament—the series of minimalistic "Meditation pictures".

"Catwalk!" was exhibited at the Showroom Eulengasse in Frankfurt, Germany in 2007. The exhibition consisted of a series of collages created of cats' heads on women's bodies. The most recognizable bodies are those of Virginia Woolf "with big, sad eyes" and Kate Moss.

In 2006 Tonnis set up a MySpace page dedicated to Thomas Bernhard, using pictures tell his biography. The theme of the page was Bernhard's motto "In the darkness everything becomes clear."

In 2008 Tonnis started to contribute reviews on art to the style magazine Dazed Digital, London.

2009: During the "Sommeratelier" at Kunstverein Familie Montez, Frankfurt, he created a painting for the performance "Who let the dogs out, Edith?". This "experimental collage of different media and arts" has been a dialogue with Heinrich von Kleist's play Penthesilea, directed by Hans-Jürgen Syberberg in 1988 with actress Edith Clever.

With the mural of a golden cross on black and violet ground—divided into pixels—Tonnis has been one of 36 international artists who designed the "Pixelkitchen" in January 2013, a tiled room of 177.2 inches height at the Günes Theatre in Frankfurt. "All these artworks are glued, painted or nailed onto the walls."

Video
Tonnis started to make videos in 2006. His subjects have included William S. Burroughs, Thomas Bernhard and the poet Georg Trakl. Alongside these works stand the video series of "Dreams", "Electrical Pictures", and animals—exhibiting a pop, surreal pictorial language, often humorously staged.

Since 2009 Tonnis produced 132 short documentaries about art projects, exhibition setups, openings and interviews for the Kunstverein Familie Montez. Of these, 16 works from December 2020 show the process of creating an 18 × 3.25 meter mural that was created by more than 40 artists in the joint project "Ein ganz normaler Herbst, nur anders ... 2020" ("A completely normal autumn, just different ... 2020). The short documentaries go together with a "Family Album", created out of video stills.

Solo exhibitions (selection)
 1986: Zeichnungen, Galerie Das Bilderhaus, Frankfurt
 1986: Zeichnungen, Galerie 42, Gießen
 1989: Christiaan Tonnis, Galerie Einbaum, Frankfurt
 1990: Christiaan Tonnis, Galerie Limberg, Frankfurt
 2006: Dialog, Kunstverein Eulengasse, Frankfurt
 2006: Zeichnung und Malerei, Höpershof, Hannover-Wedemark
 2007: CATWALK!, Kunstverein Eulengasse, Frankfurt
 2010: Hinter dem Spiegel (with a performance by Eva Moll), Klosterpresse, Frankfurt
 2011: Christiaan Tonnis: Thomas Bernhards "Frost", Kunstverein Eulengasse, Frankfurt
 2019: Christiaan Tonnis – Screening Montez 2009-14, Kunstverein Familie Montez, Frankfurt
 2021: Christiaan Tonnis – Novalis (Performance), Kunstverein Eulengasse, Frankfurt

Group exhibitions and festivals (selection)
 2007: Sem Palavras / Ohne Worte, Instituto Histórico de Olinda, Olinda
 2008: Antarctic Meltdown, Melbourne International Arts Festival, Melbourne
 2008: Sanlu Yishu, Huajiadi Beili Wangjing, Beijing
 2008: Digital Fringe 08, Melbourne Fringe Festival, Melbourne
 2008: Road Movie, Frieze Film at 6. Frieze Art Fair and Channel 4, London
 2008: Electrofringe, This Is Not Art, Newcastle
 2009: Gut ist was gefällt, Kunstverein Familie Montez, Frankfurt
 2010: 2009 Was A Rough Year – Lilly McElroy, Thomas Robertello Gallery, Chicago
 2012: Terremoto – Beben, by Nikolaus A. Nessler, in collaboration with Christiaan Tonnis (Film), Nico Rocznik (Light) and Manuel Stein (Sound), Kunsthaus Wiesbaden
 2013: Wurzeln weit mehr Aufmerksamkeit widmen, Kunstverein Familie Montez and Der Laden/Bauhaus University, Weimar
 2014: Les Fleurs du Mal – Dithering Cities, Luminale, Frankfurt
 2015: Kunst Messe Frankfurt 15, Kunstverein Familie Montez, Hall 1.2, Messe GmbH, Frankfurt
 2017: Supermarket 2017, Stockholm Independent Art Fair, Stockholm
 2018: Quinceañera, Kunstverein Eulengasse, Frankfurt
 2018: Supermarket Art Fair, Daily Film Documentation of Performances, Stockholm
 2019: Latitudes Festival, Santa Cruz de la Sierra
 2019: Open/Occupy II, Kunstfabrik am Flutgraben, Berlin
 2020: Participate NOW!, EULENGASSE @ Platforms Project NET – Independent Art Fair, Athens
 2020: Ein ganz normaler Herbst, nur anders ... , Kunstverein Familie Montez, Frankfurt
 2021: Platforms Project Net 2021, Platforms Project - Independent Art Fair, Athens 
 2021: Inspiration, Klosterpresse, Frankfurt 
 2021: be**pART, Atelier Montez, Rome

Curated exhibitions 
 2011: Schamanismus aus dem Großen Altai, Kunstverein Eulengasse, Frankfurt
 2011: Meg Cebula. Geheimnis und Schönheit, Kunstverein Eulengasse, Frankfurt

Bibliography
 Christiaan Tonnis: Krankheit als Symbol, Berlin Pro Business, 1. Edition 2006-11-03, 2006, 
 Christiaan Tonnis, Oswald-von-Nell-Breuning-Schule and the town of Rödermark: 5+5=1!, DVD-Video (25 min.), 2011, archived at the town of Rödermark
 ROT – Das Magazin des Kunstvereins Eulengasse, Axel Dielmann-Verlag, Frankfurt, 2013, p. 15-16, 145, 148-149, 15, 
 Kerstin Krone-Bayer and Hanna Rut Neidhardt (Publishers): Montez im Exil – Kunstverein Familie Montez, Frankfurt, 2014, 
 Familie Hecht – Eine Erinnerung, 2017, DVD-Video, in collaboration with the Oswald-von-Nell-Breuning-School, Rödermark, archived at the Jewish Museum Frankfurt
 Christiaan Tonnis – Die Leipziger Baumwollspinnerei, epubli Verlag Berlin, 2017, 
 Christiaan Tonnis – Das grafische Werk: 2006–2017, epubli Verlag Berlin, 2017,  
 Christiaan Tonnis – Videos 2009-2017, Kunstverein Familie Montez, Werkverzeichnis, epubli Verlag Berlin, 2017, 
 Christiaan Tonnis – Copy and Paste, epubli Verlag Berlin, 2017, 
 Christiaan Tonnis – Texte und Schriften: 1986–2017, epubli Verlag Berlin, 2017, 
 Christiaan Tonnis – Catwalk: Die Collagen, epubli Verlag Berlin, 2019, 
 Marlies ter Borg: Bipolar creativity: through the ages, Independently published, 2021-02-16, p. 69, back cover, 
 Christiaan Tonnis – Copy and Paste 2, epubli Verlag Berlin, 2021, 
 Christiaan Tonnis – Das grafische Werk: 2006–2022, epubli Verlag Berlin, 2022, 
 Christiaan Tonnis – Das fotografische Werk 1, epubli Verlag Berlin, 2022, 
 Christiaan Tonnis – Das fotografische Werk 2, epubli Verlag Berlin, 2022,

Notes

External links 

 Christiaan Tonnis in German National Library
 Christiaan Tonnis – Official Homepage
 Christiaan Tonnis – Kunstverein Familie Montez – Family Album
 Exhibitions listed on kunstaspekte.de
 Christiaan Tonnis on artfacts.net

1956 births
Living people
German contemporary artists
20th-century German painters
20th-century German male artists
German male painters
21st-century German painters
21st-century German male artists
German video artists